Antonio Vivaldi (1678–1741) was an Italian composer.

Vivaldi may also refer to:

Science and technology
Vivaldi (crater), a crater on the planet Mercury
Vivaldi antenna, a type of broadband antenna
Vivaldi coordinates, a virtual networking positioning system
Vivaldi Technologies, a software development company
Vivaldi (web browser), a web browser developed by Vivaldi Technologies
4330 Vivaldi, a minor planet

Arts, media, and entertainment
Vivaldi, the Red Priest, 2009 Italian film based upon the life of Antonio Vivaldi
"Vivaldi", a song by Pete Townshend on Lifehouse Chronicles
Vivaldi, Dutch drag queen who competed on the second season of Drag Race Holland

Other uses 

 Vivaldi (font), a script typeface
 Vivaldi (surname), including a list of people with the surname
 Vivaldi Atlantic 4, a 2005 British team who broke the eastbound record for rowing the Atlantic
 Vivaldi Glacier, a glacier in Antarctica named after the composer 
 Vivaldi potato, a potato cultivar
 Caffe Vivaldi, a former coffeehouse and restaurant in New York City

See also

Vivaldi Residences (disambiguation)
List of compositions by Antonio Vivaldi
List of operas by Antonio Vivaldi